Carmen Elena Rendiles Martínez (11 August 1903 - 9 May 1977) - in religion María Carmen - was a Venezuelan Roman Catholic professed religious from the Servants of the Eucharist and the founder of the Servants of Jesus of Caracas. Rendiles served in a leadership position for her order in France where she spent her time of religious formation and returned to Venezuela to found her order in 1965 and assume control as Superior-General of her new order.

Rendiles was titled as a Servant of God in 1994 under Pope John Paul II and later named as Venerable under Pope Francis in 2013 upon the confirmation of her heroic virtue. Francis later confirmed a miracle attributed to her in late 2017; her beatification was celebrated in Caracas on 16 June 2018.

Life
Carmen Elena Rendiles Martínez was born on 11 August 1903 in Caracas as 3 of seven children to Ramiro Antonio Rendiles and Ana Antonia Martínez. Rendiles was born without a left arm and so was given a prosthetic arm which she had attached to her for her entire life. Her baptism was celebrated in the church of Santa Anna on 24 September 1903 and she received her Confirmation on 28 October 1905; she made her First Communion on 11 March 1911.

In 1918 she felt her concrete call to the religious life. Her father died in the mid-1920s. In December 1926 religious from France arrived in the nation and she learned about them and took their arrival as a sign that she was to follow her vocation as part of their order so applied and received permission for admission into their order. Rendiles joined the Servants of the Eucharist on 25 February 1927 and moved to Toulouse in France for her religious formation where she received the habit on 8 September 1927. Rendiles made her initial profession on 8 September 1929 and made her solemn profession later on 8 September 1932 all while in France. In 1945 she was made the superior for all the order's houses in Venezuela.

Rendiles founded the Servants of Jesus on 25 March 1965; the order received diocesan approval and support on 14 August 1969 from the Cardinal Archbishop of Caracas José Humberto Quintero Parra. She was the Superior General of her new order from 1969 when she was appointed until her death.

Rendiles died in mid-1977 due to influenza. In 2015 there were 94 religious in a total of 19 communities in both Venezuela and in Colombia.

Beatification
The beatification cause started under Pope John Paul II on 18 August 1994 after the Congregation for the Causes of Saints issued the official "nihil obstat" to the cause and titled her as a Servant of God. The diocesan process was inaugurated under Cardinal José Lebrún Moratinos on 9 March 1995 while Cardinal Ignacio Velasco closed it in November 1996; there were 40 witnesses heard in 52 sessions. The C.C.S. validated the process in Rome on 18 October 1997 and received the Positio in 1998 from the postulation for their assessment.

Theologians approved the cause on 27 November 2010 as did the C.C.S. on 18 June 2013. Pope Francis named her as Venerable - on 5 July 2013 - after confirming that the late religious had lived a model life of heroic virtue in accordance with the Christian faith. The process for a miracle (which occurred on 18 July 2003 to Trinette Durán de Branger) opened in Venezuela on 1 February 2014 and closed on 18 September 2014 (Cardinal Jorge Liberato Urosa Savino oversaw the opening and closing of that process). The C.C.S. confirmed this miracle on 21 November 2017. Pope Francis approved this miracle on 18 December 2017 and her beatification was celebrated on 16 June 2018; Cardinal Angelo Amato presided over the celebration on the pope's behalf. Cardinal Savino referred to the beatification's approval as something that "brings immense joy to the entire Catholic Church of Venezuela, and especially for the Archdiocese of Caracas" where Rendiles lived and died. Cardinal Pietro Parolin - who had served as the nuncio to Venezuela - referred to the beatification as a chance for "renewal" due to "these difficult times" in Venezuela and encouraged the faithful to emulate the late Rendiles as a model for holiness.

Pope Francis referred to Rendiles the following afternoon on 17 June 2018 in his Angelus address and noted how "she served with love in the parishes, in the schools and beside those most in need".

The current - and second - postulator for this cause is Dr. Silvia Mónica Correale and the current vice-postulator is Sr. Rosa María Ríos.

References

External links
 Hagiography Circle
 Saints SQPN
 Official website
 Catholic Youth Ministry
 Santi e Beati

1903 births
1977 deaths
20th-century venerated Christians
20th-century Venezuelan Roman Catholic nuns
Beatifications by Pope Francis
Deaths from influenza
Founders of Catholic religious communities
People from Caracas
Superiors general
Venezuelan beatified people
Venerated Catholics by Pope Francis